William Joseph Sebald (November 5, 1901 – August 10, 1980) was an American diplomat who served as United States Ambassador to Burma from April 1952 to July 1954, and to Australia from 1957 to 1961.

Education and career
Sebald graduated from the U.S. Naval Academy in 1922. Sebald moved to Kobe, Japan in 1925 as part of an officer's language program. Sebald resigned from the Navy in 1930.

In 1933, Sebald earned his juris doctor degree specializing in international law from the University of Maryland. He moved back to Japan and practiced law at his father-in-laws firm from 1933 to 1939. Sebald also received an honorary doctor of laws degree from the University of Maryland for his study and work in Japanese law in 1949.

Sebald served during World War II with the Office of Naval Intelligence (ONI) back in the United States starting in 1939. Then he was on the staff of Admiral Ernest King. He was a political adviser to General Douglas MacArthur, with ambassador rank.

Sebald was U.S. Ambassador to Burma (1952–1954), Deputy Assistant Secretary of State for East Asian and Pacific Affairs (1954–1956), and Ambassador to Australia (1957–1961).

Sebald retired in 1961.

Personal life and death 
Sebald met his wife Edith France deBecker in Kobe, Japan. They were married in 1927. He died from emphysema in Naples, Florida, on August 10, 1980, at the age of 78.

Works
With MacArthur in Japan: A Personal History of the Occupation, Norton, 1965,

References

External links
 
 William Joseph Sebald at Office of the Historian, Bureau of Public Affairs, United States Department of State
 
William J. Sebald Papers, 1887–1980 MS 207 held by Special Collections & Archives, Nimitz Library at the United States Naval Academy

1901 births
1980 deaths
Ambassadors of the United States to Japan
Ambassadors of the United States to Myanmar
Ambassadors of the United States to Australia
People from Baltimore
United States Naval Academy alumni
United States Foreign Service personnel
20th-century American diplomats